Catopsis floribunda is a species in the genus Catopsis. This species is native to the West Indies, Venezuela, Honduras, Oaxaca, and Florida.

References

floribunda
Flora of the Caribbean
Flora of Venezuela
Flora of Honduras
Flora of Oaxaca
Flora of Florida
Plants described in 1937
Flora without expected TNC conservation status